Borislav "Boro" Vučević (born August 7, 1958) is a Montenegrin former professional basketball player. He is the father of NBA All-Star Nikola Vučević.

National team career 
Vučević was a member of the Yugoslavia national team that competed at the EuroBasket 1985 in West Germany. Over eight tournament games, he averaged 9.4 points per game.

Also, Vučević won the gold medal at the 1983 Mediterranean Games in Morocco.

Career achievements and awards 
 EuroLeague champion: 1 (with Bosna: 1978–79)
 Yugoslav League champion: 2 (with Bosna: 1979–80, 1982–83)
 Yugoslav Cup winner: 1 (with Bosna: 1983–84)

Personal life 
Vučević's wife, Ljiljana (Née Kubura), was a 6-foot-2 basketball forward for a Sarajevo-based club Željezničar, as well as for the Yugoslavia Cadet national team at the 1976 FIBA Europe Championship for Cadets. They have a son Nikola (born 1990), who is a professional basketball player.

References

External links
 Profile at eurobasket.com

1958 births
Living people
Competitors at the 1983 Mediterranean Games
People from Bar, Montenegro
KK Bosna Royal players
Liège Basket players
Mediterranean Games gold medalists for Yugoslavia
Montenegrin expatriate basketball people in Belgium
Montenegrin expatriate basketball people in Switzerland
Montenegrin men's basketball players
Naturalised citizens of Belgium
Serbs of Montenegro
Small forwards
Yugoslav men's basketball players
Mediterranean Games medalists in basketball